The women's 100 metre freestyle was a swimming event held as part of the swimming at the 1932 Summer Olympics programme. It was the fifth appearance of the event, which was established in 1912. The competition was held on Saturday August 6, 1932 and on Monday August 8, 1932.

Twenty swimmers from ten nations competed.

Records
These were the standing world and Olympic records (in minutes) prior to the 1932 Summer Olympics.

In the heats the Olympic record was broken in the second heat by Joyce Cooper with 1:09.0, in the third heat by Helene Madison with 1:08.9 and in the fourth heat Eleanor Saville with 1:08.5. In the first semi-final Willy den Ouden bettered the Olympic record with 1:07.6 and in the final Madison again set a new Olympic record with 1:06.8.

Results

Heats

Saturday August 6, 1932: The fastest two in each heat and the fastest third-placed from across the heats advanced to the final.

Heat 1

Heat 2

Heat 3

Heat 4

Semifinals

Sunday August 7, 1932: The fastest three in each semi-final advanced to the final.

Semifinal 1

Semifinal 2

Final

Monday August 8, 1932:

References

External links
Olympic Report
 

Swimming at the 1932 Summer Olympics
1932 in women's swimming
Swim